Lasiothyris diclada is a species of moth of the family Tortricidae. It is found in Brazil (Minas Gerais, Paraná) and Costa Rica.

References

Moths described in 1986
Cochylini